Antonio Nicolo Gasparo Jacobsen (November 2, 1850 – February 2, 1921) was a Danish-born American maritime artist known as the "Audubon of Steam Vessels".

Biography
Jacobsen was born in Copenhagen, Denmark where he attended the Royal Academy of Design before heading across the Atlantic Ocean. He arrived in the United States in August 1873. He settled in West Hoboken, New Jersey (now Union City, New Jersey), across the Hudson River from Manhattan and New York Harbor, its port filled with ships from America and around the world. Jacobsen got his start painting pictures of ships on safes, and as his reputation grew, he was asked to do portraits of ships by their owners, captains and crew members, with many of his works selling for five dollars.

Jacobsen painted more than 6,000 portraits of sail and steam vessels, making him "the most prolific of marine artists". Many of his commissions came from sea captains, and Jacobsen was chosen both for the accuracy of his work and his low fee.

Exhibitions and collections

Exhibitions of Jacobsen's work include a 1996 showing of 45 of his paintings at the National Museum of American History. In 1995, the Mariners' Museum in Newport News, Virginia held an exhibition that included 80 paintings by Jacobsen. In conjunction with the exhibition, the museum published a volume by Harold S. Sniffen, the museum's curator emeritus, whose biography titled Antonio Jacobsen's Painted Ships on Painted Oceans, includes some 100 color pictures of the artist's ship paintings.

The public rooms of The Griswold Inn in Essex, Connecticut, the oldest continuously run tavern in the United States, features the largest privately held collection of Jacobsen's paintings. John McMullen, a naval architect and marine engineer (and former owner of the New Jersey Devils), had a collection that included 75 paintings by Jacobsen, the first two of which were found in the 1940s in the offices of the family ship repair business.

On February 19, 2006, Fetching The Mark, an unsigned painting of the racing yacht Dreadnought attributed to Jacobsen, was sold at auction for $281,000, more than triple the highest price previously paid for one of Jacobsen's works. The piece had been brought to an Antiques Road Show event in Tampa, Florida, and had originally been thought to be a work of Jacobsen's contemporary James E. Buttersworth, until further research led to a conclusion that it was by Jacobsen.

Personal
Jacobsen and his wife Mary had three children; Carl, Helen and Alphonse.

Gallery

See also
William Frederick Mitchell
Henry Reuterdahl
Willy Stöwer
Burnell Poole

References

External links

The Early Years – Exhibition of works painted between 1877 and 1898.
The Later Years – Exhibition of works painted between 1902 and 1916.
Antonio Jacobsen Bio - Findlay Galleries
"USAT Sherman", oil on canvas, 1910-1915, by Antonio Jacobsen(sold at auction by GB Tate and Sons Fine Art, from the estate of Impressionist Emerson Everett Glass(1916-1987)..)
Works by Antonio Jacobsen The Mariners' Museum
portrait of Antonio Jacobsen
wife and children of Antonio Jacobsen
portrait of Jacobsen in later years

Further reading
Antonio Jacobsen-The Checklist.  Compiled by Harold S. Sniffen, 1984.  Sanford & Patricia Smith Galleries, Ltd.: New York, NY.

1850 births
1921 deaths
19th-century American painters
19th-century Danish painters
20th-century American painters
20th-century Danish painters
American marine artists
Artists from Copenhagen
Artists from New Jersey
Danish emigrants to the United States
Danish male painters
Danish marine artists
People from Union City, New Jersey
19th-century Danish male artists
20th-century Danish male artists